Wallace's Monument, the Wallace Tower, or the Barnweil Monument (NS 240655 629488) is a category-A-listed building dedicated to the memory of William Wallace located on Barnweil Hill, a prominent location in the parish of Craigie, South Ayrshire, Scotland.

History

Purpose and origins

The Wallace Monument is a picturesque Gothic structure and is in a prominent situation, built to commemorate William Wallace at the time of an upsurge in the Scottish desire for self-determination, predating the 1869 Wallace Monument at Stirling. The story is that the name derives from an occasion when Wallace, standing on this elevated site, remarked that the Barns of Ayr (containing English soldiers) `burn weil' is an invention, the reason for the name actually being that it is situated close to the remains of the medieval parish church of Barnweil, a parish that suppressed in the 17th century.

The Ayr Advertiser of 12 October 1854 carried an advertisement calling for designs for the monument to be submitted to W F Love of Beith by 1 January 1855. The Ayr Advertiser of 30 October 1856 stated that the monument was designed by William Dobie of Beith, and was built by Mr Snodgrass. The Dobies were a well-to-do professional family with antiquarian interests. No evidence has been found of any call for public subscription. Robert Snodgrass senior, son of William Snodgrass, mason of Beith, practised as an architect-builder in Beith. The land was donated by Brigadier-General James George Smith-Neil of Barnweil House in 1855.

William Patrick of Roughwood and Woodside near Beith is also said to have erected the monument. Dobie states that after repeated attempts to arouse public sympathy in its favour he built the tower at his own expense.

Etymology
The name, also used as Barnwell, Barnweill and Burnweill, first recorded as Berenbouell circa 1177-1204 and Brenwyfle in 1306, is one of a cluster of names in this area that contains the Cymric place-name element pren-, meaning 'tree'.

Architecture

Base course; string courses; corbelled, shouldered band course between 2nd and 3rd stages; machicolated, crenellated parapet with thistle-finialled, conical-capped circular angle pinnacles and ball-finialled, ogee-capped square-plan wallhead pinnacles. Diagonally-boarded timber door in Tudor-arched, roll-moulded doorway with hoodmould to the south-east elevation; similar inscription recesses at other elevations. Round-arched recesses at 2nd stage; paired round-arched recesses at 3rd stage.

The Wallace family coat of arms and their motto 'Pro Libertate Patriae' are located above the entrance, carved by John Logan, a local sculptor.

A spiral staircase leads up to the viewing platform and the arms of the Wallace family are blazoned in bas-relief above the entrance door.

Inscriptions

Tower base
On three sides are single bronze panels bearing rousing proclamations of Wallace's virtues and misfortunes :

Side 1 - "Erected MCCCCLV., in honour of Scotland's greatest national hero, the renowned Sir William Wallace, born MCCLXX., who after performing numerous exploits of the most consummate bravery in defence of the independence of his country was basely betrayed into the hands of his enemies by whom, to their everlasting disgrace, he was unjustifiably put to death on the XXII. of August, MCCC. Centuries have not dimmed the lustre of his heroic achievements; and the memory of this most disinterested of patriots shall through all ages be honoured and revered by his countrymen."

Side 2 - "Sir William Wallace, Regent of Scotland, MCCXCVII. In resistance to treacherous invasion, and in defence of the laws and liberties of his country, he fought against fearful odds the desperate battles of Biggar, Stirling, Blackearnside, and Falkirk, and between these actions, in little more than a year, he stormed and took from the invaders very fortress, castle, and town which they had seized in the Kingdom. Though worsted at Falkirk by overwhelming numbers, aided by fatal dissensions in his own army, he continued warring with the oppressors of his native land until his foul betrayal, seven years after that disastrous battle, by the execrable Monteith."

Side 3 - 

"Ever honoured be the memory of the matchless Sir William wallace, the first of his countrymen who in an age of despair arose and 

throw off the yoke of foreign oppression, and maintain the independence and nationality of Scotland; and who, by deeds of surpassing valour and stainless patriotism, has glorified this his native land, and imperishably associated his name with the defence of national rights and the liberties and immunities of freeborn men. From Greece arose Leonidas, from Scotland Wallace, and from America Washington - names which shall remain through all time the watchwords and beacons of liberty."

Tower summit
Cut into the stonework at the top of the tower are the words "The Barns o' Ayr burn weel"

Environs and Warden's Lodge

The tower stands in a circular enclosed area of ground with a group of trees surviving from the original extensive plantings.

To the left of the gate as you enter the plot once stood a neat lodge where the tower's warden or guide lived. In Archibald Adamson's time (1875) a Visitors' book existed that shows over 2000 visitors between 1857 and 1858. A number of interesting portraits were displayed, including a fine lithograph of Wallace was amongst and amongst the others were portraits of Robert Burns, King Robert the Bruce, General Neill and a full-length portrait of the Earl of Eglinton.

The OS Maps indicate that the lodge stood until the 1970s, however no remains are now extant. It has also been suggested that it was demolished between 1945 and 1947, the contents being taken to Ayr Town Hall.

The view from the tower battlements is of the town of Ayr, the site of Coilsfield House, Rosemount, Tarbolton, Arran, Kilmarnock, and the Carrick Hills.

Ownership and access
The tower was not provided with an endowment by its builders and became the responsibility of the Ayr Town Council and its successor, South Ayrshire Council. At first, as stated, a guide was employed to show visitors around, later the key was available from nearby Barnweil Hill Farm, then the monument could be accessed by arrangement with South Ayrshire Council. At present the tower is closed, although a 'Tourist' road sign exists to direct visitors to view the site. No car park exists.

Flying the Saltire
For many years the flag on the tower was flown at half mast on 25 September, the day on which General Neil of Barnweil was killed. Bryden records that 'the flag' was displayed on 15 May, 12 June, 12 July and 11 September, as these were the dates of the burning of the Barns of Ayr, and the battles of Biggar, Black Earnside, and Stirling in the years 1297 and 1298. Additionally the flag was raised on 24 June to commemorate Bannockburn and on the birthday of Robert Burns, every 25 January.

See also
 Barnweill Church
 Wallace Monument

References
Notes

Sources

 Allan, Shiela et al. (2003). Historic Prestwick and its surroundings. Ayr: AANHS. .
 Adamson, Archibald R. (1875). Rambles Round Kilmarnock. Kilmarnock : T. Stevenson.
 Bryden, Robert (1915). Ayrshire Monuments Etched by Robert Bryden. Ayr : Stephen & Pollock.
 Campbell, Thorbjørn (2003). Ayrshire. A Historical Guide. Edinburgh : Birlinn. 
 Close, Robert (1992). Ayrshire and Arran: An Illustrated Architectural Guide. Pub. Roy Inc Arch Scot. .
 Cuthbertson, D. C. Autumn in Kyle and the Charm of Cunninghame. London : Herbert Jenkins.
 Dobie, James D. (ed Dobie, J.S.) (1876). Cunninghame, Topographized by Timothy Pont 1604–1608, with continuations and illustrative notices. Glasgow: John Tweed.
 Loudoun, Craufurd C. (1999). In Pursuit of Sir William Wallace. Darvel : Craufurd C. Loudoun. .
 Love, Dane (2003). Ayrshire : Discovering a County. Ayr : Fort Publishing. .
 Nimmo, John W. (2003). Symington Village, Church and People. Darvel : Alloway Publishing. .

External links

 Aerial view - Barnweill Tower.
 Geograph.
 The Wallace trail'
 Flickr Photographs'
 Barnweill Church, Castle and the Wallace Monument.
 Annotated video of Wallace's Monument.

Towers completed in 1857
History of South Ayrshire
Category A listed buildings in South Ayrshire
Buildings and structures in South Ayrshire
Folly buildings in Scotland
Monuments and memorials in Scotland
William Wallace
Observation towers in the United Kingdom
1857 establishments in Scotland